NBC 3 may refer  to:

United States

Current affiliates
 KCRA-TV, Sacramento, California
 KFDX-TV, Wichita Falls, Texas
 KIEM-TV, Eureka, California
 KSAN-TV, San Angelo, Texas
 KSNV, Las Vegas, Nevada
 KSNW, Wichita, Kansas
 KYTV (TV), Springfield, Missouri
 WAVE-TV, Louisville, Kentucky
 WKYC, Cleveland, Ohio
 WLBT, Jackson, Mississippi
 WRCB, Chattanooga, Tennessee
 WSAV-TV, Savannah, Georgia
 WSAZ-TV, Huntington/Charleston, West Virginia
 WSTM-TV, Syracuse, New York
 WSVW-LD, Harrisonburg, Virginia (broadcasts on channel 30; branded as NBC 3 in the Valley) 
 Simulcasted on WHSV-TV channel 3.2

Formerly affiliated
 KMTV-TV, Omaha, Nebraska (affiliated with NBC from 1956 to 1986)
 KNTV, San Francisco / Oakland / San Jose, California (formerly branded by its cable channel number as NBC 3 in 2002)
 KYW-TV, Philadelphia, Pennsylvania (affiliated with NBC from 1941 to 1995)
 WJMN-TV, Escanaba, Michigan (1969 to 1983)
 WTAR-TV (now WTKR), Norfolk, Virginia (1952 to 1953)
 WTMJ-TV, Milwaukee, Wisconsin (was on channel 3 from 1947 to 1953)

Japan
Nagasaki Broadcasting (JOUR-DTV), Nagasaki, Nagasaki Prefecture, Japan (affiliated with JNN)